Mordehai Kikayon (also transliterated as Mordechai Kikion) (1915-1993) was one of the founders of the computer industry of Israel, the organizer and first head of Mamram. Before and after Mamram he was with the Rafael Advanced Defense Systems.

Mordechai Kikayon was born in Russian Empire and immigrated to the land of Israel in 1924. He was appointed to be the first commander of Mamram by head of Operations Directorate aluf Yitzhak Rabin on June 26, 1959.  He was the first Israeli civilian to head a military unit.

See also
Kikoin, for a possible origin of the surname

References

Further reading
"The WEIZAC Challenge: Building an Electronic Brain in Rehovot", published in: WEIZAC: An Israeli Pioneering Adventure in Electronic Computing (1945–1963) (behind the paywall)

1915 births
1993 deaths

Israeli computer scientists
Immigrants to Mandatory Palestine
Israeli military personnel